The 135th (Limerick) Regiment of Foot was an infantry regiment of Fencibles in the British Army, created and promptly disbanded in 1796. The regiment, raised by Sir Vere Hunt, did not see any active service; it served solely to recruit soldiers. On disbandment, the recruits were drafted into other regiments. The regiment has the interesting historical distinction of having had the highest regimental number of any British line regiment.

References

Infantry regiments of the British Army
Military units and formations established in 1796
Military units and formations disestablished in 1796
Fencible regiments of the British Army
Defunct Irish regiments of the British Army
1796 establishments in Great Britain